The 2010–11 season was the 108th in the history of the Southern League, which is an English football competition featuring semi-professional and amateur clubs from the South West, South Central and Midlands of England and South Wales.

Premier Division
The Premier Division consisted of 22 clubs, including 17 clubs from the previous season and five new clubs:
Chesham United, promoted from Division One Central
Cirencester Town, promoted from Division One South & West
Salisbury City, demoted from the Conference Premier
Weymouth, relegated from the Conference South
Windsor & Eton, promoted from Division One South & West

At the end of the previous season Salisbury City failed to come out of administration and thus were relegated two divisions down due to a breach of Conference rules. In the middle of the season Windsor & Eton folded due to financial problems, the club was expelled from the league, their record was expunged.

Truro City won the Premier Division to earn a fourth promotion in five seasons, and were promoted to the Conference South along with play-off winners Salisbury City.

Didcot Town, Halesowen Town and Tiverton Town were relegated this season. No clubs were reprieved from relegation from Premier Division for the first time since 2005–06 season.

League table

Play-offs

Stadia and locations

Division One Central
Division One Central consisted of 22 clubs, including 13 clubs from previous season Midland division and nine new clubs:
Three clubs transferred from Division One South & West:
A.F.C. Hayes
Bedfont Green, also changed name to Bedfont Town
Uxbridge

Plus:
Ashford Town (Middlesex), relegated from Isthmian League Premier Division
Aylesbury, promoted from the Spartan South Midlands League
Daventry Town, promoted from the United Counties League
North Greenford United, promoted from the Combined Counties League
Northwood, transferred from Isthmian League Division One North
Rugby Town, relegated from the Premier Division

Arlesey Town won the division and were promoted to the Premier Division along with play-off winners Hitchin Town. Beaconsfield SYCOB finished bottom of the table were reprieved after Premier Division club Windsor & Eton folded and Atherstone Town resigned from the league.

League table

Play-offs

Stadia and locations

Division One South & West
Division One South & West consisted of 22 clubs, including 16 clubs from previous season and six new clubs:
Almondsbury Town, promoted from the Hellenic League
Bideford, promoted from the Western League
Bromsgrove Rovers, transferred from Division One Central
Clevedon Town, relegated from the Premier Division
Stourport Swifts, transferred from Division One Central
Wimborne Town, promoted from the Wessex League

Before the start of the season Bromsgrove Rovers were removed from the league due to ground problems. No club was promoted to take the place of Bromsgrove, and therefore the season was played with 21 clubs. VT F.C. were renamed Sholing.

A.F.C. Totton won the title and were promoted to the Premier Division along with play-off winners Frome Town. In April 2011 it was announced that Almondsbury Town would resign from the league at the end of the season due to ground problems, and so Andover, the only South & West club that finished in the relegation zone, were reprieved.

League table

Play-offs

Stadia and locations

League Cup

The Southern League Cup 2010–11 (billed as the RedInsure Cup 2010–11 for sponsorship reasons) is the 73rd season of the Southern League Cup, the cup competition of the Southern Football League. 65 clubs took part. The competition commenced on 21 September 2010. The winners were Hednesford Town who beat Hemel Hempstead Town 5–1 on aggregate over two legs.

Calendar

Preliminary round

In the preliminary round, the four clubs played each other for a places in the first round.

First round

The two clubs to have made it through the preliminary round were entered into the draw with sixty Southern League club, making sixty-two clubs, while Hednesford Town received a bye to the next round.

Second round

The thirty-two clubs to have made it through the first round were entered into the second round draw. Hednesford Town received a bye to this round.

Third round

The sixteen clubs to have made it through the second round were entered into the third round draw.

1 Hemel Hempsted Town advanced as Windsor & Eton resigned from the Southern League and folded.

Quarterfinals

Semifinals

Final

See also
Southern Football League
2010–11 Isthmian League
2010–11 Northern Premier League

References

External links
Official website

Southern Football League seasons
7